Miss República Dominicana 1989 was held on December 19, 1988. There were 28 candidates, representing provinces and municipalities, who entered. The winner would represent the Dominican Republic at Miss Universe 1989. The first runner up would enter Miss World 1989. The second runner up would enter in Miss International 1989. The rest of finalist entered different pageants. This is the first edition were provinces are represented and no more than one more representation.

Results

Delegates

External links
https://web.archive.org/web/20090211102742/http://ogm.elcaribe.com.do/ogm/consulta.aspx

Miss Dominican Republic
1989 beauty pageants
1989 in the Dominican Republic